WUBB (106.9 FM) is a country music formatted radio station targeted towards Savannah and Hilton Head known as "Bob 106.9". At one time the station was on 104.9, which did not provide as strong a signal.

History
In December, 1987, WIJY signed on 107.9 FM as what was then known as the in vogue New Adult Contemporary, or smooth jazz. In 1996, WIJY was moved to 106.9 as "Joy 106.9". In 1998, the station changed its callsign to WWVV-FM and became Modern AC as "Wave 106.9 - Your Hit Music Station" and then flipped to modern rock as "Wave 106.9 - Savannah's New Rock Alternative" in December 2000. Also in 2000, Triad Broadcasting purchased all Adventure Radio stations. The station flipped again in 2002 to Hot AC as "Wave 106.9 - The New Music Alternative" before flipping to Adult Album Alternative (as "Modern Music - Wave 106.9") in 2003; that same year, 104.9 and 106.9 switched formats.  The station then adopted the call letters WGZR.

The station was known as "Gator 106.9" until the week of March 12, 2007, when the station rebranded to "Lucky Dog Country 106.9". WGZR again rebranded itself in late April 2008, to "Country 106.9".  Another rebrand occurred February 21, 2011, at 1:06 PM when the station became "Bob 106.9" and changed its call letters to WUBB, launching with a commercial-free 'preview' for the rest of the day while Bob "redecorated" 106.9. The first song on Bob 106.9 was My Kinda Party by Macon native Jason Aldean.

Effective May 1, 2013, L&L Broadcasting (later merged into Alpha Media) purchased WUBB and 29 other stations from Triad Broadcasting at a price of $21 million.

In September 2017, Dick Broadcasting announced the purchase of Alpha Media stations in three markets.

Former logo

References

External links

Bob FM stations
Country radio stations in the United States
UBB
Alpha Media radio stations